KNAM, branded as The Monkey, is an oldies radio station in Silt that broadcasts on 1490 AM. It serves listeners in the Western Slope, along the Colorado River and Interstate 70, northwest of Aspen and the Roaring Fork Valley, and northeast of Grand Junction. It simulcasts with KKVT-HD2.

On August 20, 2020, KNAM changed their format from a simulcast of sports-formatted KTMM to simulcast of oldies-formatted KKVT-HD2 Grand Junction, branded as "The Monkey".

Previous logo

References

External links
The Monkey

NAM
Oldies radio stations in the United States